Republican Township may refer to the following townships in the United States:

 Republican City Township, Harlan County, Nebraska
 Republican Township, Jefferson County, Indiana
 Republican Township, Clay County, Kansas